William Randall Wyrozub (born April 8, 1950) is a Canadian former professional ice hockey centre. Wyrozub played in the National Hockey League and World Hockey Association between 1970 and 1976,

Born in Lacombe, Alberta, he was drafted in the fourth round, 43rd overall, by the Buffalo Sabres in the 1970 NHL Amateur Draft. He played 100 games in the National Hockey League with the Sabres, scoring eight goals and adding ten assists. He later played fifty-five games in the World Hockey Association with the Indianapolis Racers, scoring eleven goals and adding fourteen assists.

Career statistics

Regular season and playoffs

External links

1950 births
Living people
Buffalo Sabres draft picks
Buffalo Sabres players
Canadian ice hockey centres
Cincinnati Swords players
Edmonton Oil Kings (WCHL) players
Erie Blades players
Ice hockey people from Alberta
Indianapolis Racers players
Mohawk Valley Comets (NAHL) players
Muskegon Mohawks players
Ponoka Stampeders players
Richmond Robins players
Salt Lake Golden Eagles (WHL) players
San Francisco Shamrocks players
Tucson Rustlers players